The Goddess and Other Women is a collection of short stories by Joyce Carol Oates. It was published by Vanguard Press in 1974.

While the stories in Marriages and Infidelities (1972) had dealt with love relationships and metaphorical marriages, the stories in this collection are unified by the fact that they are all portraits of different types of women.

Joanne V. Creighton points out that the title of this volume refers to the Hindu goddess Kali who appears in the story "The Goddess" as a statuette: "her savage fat-cheeked face fixed in a grin, her many arms outspread, and around her neck what looked like a necklace of skulls." Creighton also quotes from a letter by Oates in which she confirms that Kali is in fact the goddess implied in the collection's title.

Kali is a cruel goddess, the necklace of skulls has to be considered as a symbol of her destructiveness, and she is often depicted as feeding on the entrails of her lovers. Yet Creighton emphasizes that this destructiveness must not be overestimated and that the female characters in The Goddess and Other Women have to be regarded as complex and rather ambiguous figures:But for all her terribleness, Kali is yet looked upon not as evil but as part of nature's totality: life feeds on life; destruction is an intrinsic part of nature's procreative process. So, rather than portraying women as our literary myths would have them - which, as Leslie Fiedler and others have pointed out, almost invariably depict women as either good or evil - Oates presents them as locked into the destructive form of Kali, unliberated into the totality of female selfhood.

Stories 

 "A Premature Autobiography"
 "The Goddess"
 "Honeybit"
 "The Daughter"
 "Magna Mater"
 "Ruth"
 "Unpublished Fragments"
 "Psychiatric Services"
 "The Girl"
 "The Wheel"
 "Assault"
 "Concerning the Case of Bobby T."
 "Explorations"
 "I Must Have You"
 "The Maniac"
 "... & Answers"
 "Narcotic"
 "A Girl at the Edge of the Ocean"
 "Small Avalanches"
 "Blindfold"
 "Free"
 "Waiting"
 "In the Warehouse"
 "The Voyage to Rosewood"

References 

1974 short story collections
Short story collections by Joyce Carol Oates
Vanguard Press books